The 1906 Eye by-election was held on 6 April 1906.  The by-election was held due to the resignation of the incumbent Liberal MP, Francis Seymour Stevenson.  It was won by the Liberal candidate Harold Pearson.

Result

References

1906 elections in the United Kingdom
1906 in England
Mid Suffolk District
Eye
Eye, Suffolk